Rodrigo Alonso Loyola Salas (born February 28, 1974) is a Canadian politician who was elected in the 2015 Alberta general election to the Legislative Assembly of Alberta representing the electoral district of Edmonton-Ellerslie and re-elected on April 16, 2019. Loyola had previously contested the same seat for the same party in the 2012 Alberta general election.  He placed third in the 2014 Alberta NDP leadership race.

Personal life 
Loyola has a Bachelors of Arts from University of Alberta, where he worked as an academic program coordinator and student advisor for University of Alberta. Loyola was elected President of the Non-Academic Staff Association.

Loyola is on the board of Friends of Medicare. Loyola volunteered for the Knottwood Community League, the Post-Secondary Education Task Force for Public Interest Alberta.

Electoral history

2019 general election

2015 general election

2012 general election

References

1970s births
Alberta New Democratic Party MLAs
Living people
Politicians from Edmonton
Politicians from Santiago
Chilean emigrants to Canada
21st-century Canadian politicians
Canadian trade unionists